(not to be confused with Tomas Mrazek, the boxer with an impressive 10-75 record).

Tomáš Mrázek (born August 24, 1982, in Brno) is a professional Czech rock climber  specializing in lead climbing competitions. He won two World Championships, in 2003 and 2005,  and one Lead World Cup, in 2004.

Biography 
Tomáš started climbing on the rocks of Stránská skála near Brno in 1997. Only two years later, he could climb his first 8a and in the subsequent year managed to win the Czech Championship in lead climbing.
	
 In 2001 he became Junior World Champion in Imst, Austria, Vice World Champion in Winterthur, Suisse, and he won the prestigious Rock Master competition in Arco, Italy.
 In 2002 he reached the overall 2nd place of the Lead World Cup and succeeded to repeat the legendary route Underground 9a redpoint in Massone near Arco.
 In 2003 he won the World Championship in lead in Chamonix, France, and climbed Sanjski Par Extension 9a in Mišja Peč, Slovenia.
 In 2004 he became overall winner of the Lead World Cup.
 In 2005 he repeated to win the World Championships in Munich, Germany and placed 2nd at the World Games in Duisburg, Germany. Moreover he succeeded to onsight Pata Negra in Rodellar, the second 8c onsight ever, and Martin Krpan 9a in Mišja Peč.
Tomáš has been keeping to win the Czech Championships annually.

Rankings

Climbing World Cup

Climbing World Championships

Number of medals in the World Cup

Lead

Rock climbing

Redpointed routes 
:
 Xaxid Hostel - Mišja Peč (SLO) - 5 November 2009 - First ascent
 Open Your Mind Direct - Santa Linya (ESP) - 2009

:
 Halupca 1978 - Mišja Peč (SLO)
 Fuck the system - Santa Linya (ESP) - 20 March 2009
 Seleció natural extensión - Santa Linya (ESP) - 10 March 2009
 Analogica - Santa Linya (ESP) - 16 December 2008
 Martin Krpan - Mišja Peč (SLO) - 5 April 2005
 Sanjski Par Extension - Mišja Peč (SLO) - 4 April 2003
 Underground - Massone (ITA) - 2002 - Bolted by Manfred Stuffer in 1998

Onsighted routes 
:
 Humildes pa´casa – Oliana (ESP) – 17 March 2009
 Pata Negra - Rodellar (ESP) – 10 August 2005 – Second-ever 8c onsight in history after Yuji Hirayama.

See also 
List of grade milestones in rock climbing
History of rock climbing
Rankings of most career IFSC gold medals

References

External links 
 
 
 Interview on czechclimbing.com
 Interview on climbandmore.com

Czech rock climbers
1982 births
Living people
World Games silver medalists
Competitors at the 2005 World Games
Sportspeople from Brno
IFSC Climbing World Championships medalists
IFSC Climbing World Cup overall medalists